Andrew Hunter (born 10 December 1952) is an Irish former swimmer. He competed in the men's 100 metre freestyle at the 1972 Summer Olympics.

References

External links
 

1952 births
Living people
Irish male swimmers
Olympic swimmers of Ireland
Swimmers at the 1972 Summer Olympics
Place of birth missing (living people)